Chloroclystis viridigrisea is a moth in the family Geometridae. It was described by Prout in 1937. It is endemic to São Tomé.

References

External links

Moths described in 1937
viridigrisea